Kite skating, sometimes referred to as Kiteblading, is a land-based extreme sport that uses powerful and controllable kites to propel riders of inline skates or off-road skates. They can reach speeds up to 60+ mph across parking lots, desert dry lakes, grassy fields, and sandy beaches.

Four-line, steerable para-foil kites are used as the power source. Typically used in rough terrain, kite skates use large pneumatic tires (8 to 12 inch diameter). Similar to Kite ice skating.

External links 
 Extreme Kites (www.ExtremeKites.com.au) Reviews, Videos, News, Buyers Guide, Professional Rider Interviews, Forums, Galleries & More.
 Doomwheels Kite Skating History of kite skating, skate building instructions, learn to kite skate plus kite traction photo gallery.
 Kite Skating Resources Kite skate building supplies and instruction.
 Rockville All Terrain Sports US Manufacturer of Kiteblades.
 Kiteblading Ltd UK online shop specialising in Kiteblading equipment.
 Historical 1918 article on making a kite to hold while ice skating - 

Inline skating
Aggressive skating
Kites